Carnarvon Airport  is a small South African airport located in Carnarvon (Pixley ka Seme District Municipality), Northern Cape.  The airport is managed by the Carnarvon Flying Club.  It mainly accommodates light and ultra-light aircraft.

The Carnarvon Flying Club hosts an annual Fly-In to raise funds to maintain and improve the airport. The last major upgrade was adding runway edge lights along runway 16/34.

Airfield information

 Communication Frequencies
 Carnarvon Ground 124.80 MHz (Only during Fly-In)
 Runway lights only on runway 16/34.

References

External links
Carnarvon Flying Club - Fly In. Official Facebook page

Airports in South Africa
Transport in the Northern Cape
Pixley ka Seme District Municipality